Reuben Thompson (born 15 February 2001) is a New Zealand professional racing cyclist, who currently rides for UCI WorldTeam .

Career
In July 2021 Thompson took the biggest win of his career taking home all the main jerseys in the Giro della Valle d'Aosta. Starting in 2023, Thompson will ride for UCI WorldTeam . Starting as the defending champion at the Giro della Valle d'Aosta in 2022 Thompson finished in second place overall behind fellow team-leader Lenny Martinez. In August he rode the GP Capodarco where he came fourth, 7 seconds down on the winner.

Major results

2019
 3rd Time trial, National Junior Road Championships
 6th Overall Ain Bugey Valromey Tour
2020
 1st Stage 3 Tour of Southland
2021
 1st  Overall Giro della Valle d'Aosta
1st  Mountains classification
1st  Points classification 
 1st Stage 1 (TTT) New Zealand Cycle Classic
 3rd Overall Tour du Pays de Montbéliard
 3rd Road race, National Under-23 Road Championships
 5th Overall Ronde de l'Isard
2022
 2nd Overall Circuit des Ardennes
1st  Young rider classification
 2nd Overall Giro della Valle d'Aosta
1st Stage 4
 2nd Overall Ronde de l'Isard
 4th Overall Tour Alsace
 4th GP Capodarco
 5th Overall Giro Ciclistico d'Italia
 5th Trofeo Bonin Costruzioni
2023
 4th Road race, National Road Championships

References

External links

2001 births
Living people
New Zealand male cyclists
People from Queenstown, New Zealand